Events from the year 2017 in Scotland.

Incumbents 

 First Minister and Keeper of the Great Seal – Nicola Sturgeon 
 Secretary of State for Scotland – David Mundell

Law officers 
 Lord Advocate – James Wolffe
 Solicitor General for Scotland – Alison Di Rollo
 Advocate General for Scotland – Lord Keen of Elie

Judiciary 
 Lord President of the Court of Session and Lord Justice General – Lord Carloway
 Lord Justice Clerk – Lady Dorrian
 Chairman of the Scottish Land Court – Lord Minginish

Events 
 19 January – The Scottish Government sets a target of a 66% reduction in harmful emissions within a fifteen-year timescale
 16 March – U.K. Prime Minister Theresa May formally rejects Nicola Sturgeon's second Scottish Independence Referendum timetable for Autumn 2018, or at least before Brexit negotiations are concluded.
 27 April – The population of Scotland reaches a record high, standing at 5,404,700
 4 May – United Kingdom local elections: Labour is pushed into third place by the Conservatives in Scotland, where the Scottish National Party is comfortably the largest; despite failing to take control of target councils.
 12 May – WannaCry ransomware attack hits computers in many Scottish National Health Service institutions
 8 June – The United Kingdom general election results in Scotland see the Scottish National Party re-emerge as the largest single party with 35 seats, but the Conservatives overtake Labour into second place, with Labour being pushed into third place for the first time since the 1918 general election 99 years previously. This is the most successful result for the Conservatives in Scotland since 1983, who gained twelve seats from the SNP. Notable losses included: Former First Minister, Alex Salmond and SNP Depute Leader, Angus Robertson
 27 June – Nicola Sturgeon announces that she will delay plans for a proposed second Scottish independence referendum
 19 August – The UK's last postbus runs on the Tongue–Lairg route
 29 August – Kezia Dugdale resigns as Leader of the Scottish Labour Party after two years in the role
 30 August – The Queensferry Crossing opens to traffic
 31 August – STV, Scotland's national broadcaster, celebrates sixty years since its first broadcast
 2 September – The first of 50,000 people begin their walk on the newly opened Queensferry Crossing; the walk is a "once in a lifetime" chance as the new bridge does not have pedestrian walkways
 4 September
 The Queen officially opens the new Queensferry Crossing
 Rough Guides names Scotland as the world's most beautiful country 
 5 September – First Minister Nicola Sturgeon makes a statement to the Scottish Parliament, outlining the SNP Government's priorities for the coming year, including scrapping the 1% public sector pay cap, implementing of a new Education Bill as well as actions to support the Scottish economy
 8 September – Phillip Gormley, the Chief Constable of Police Scotland, Scotland's national police force, resigns from the position following allegations of misconduct
 12 September – Parts of Scotland is hit by torrential rain and gale-force winds, reaching 75mph in some parts of the country 
 21 September – It is discovered several households in the Glasgow City Council area have similar cladding to that on Grenfell Tower which lead to a serious fire in June 2017; Glasgow City Council has not previously told residents nor the Scottish Fire & Rescue Service
 October – Hywind Scotland, the world's first commercial wind farm using floating wind turbines, is commissioned offshore of Peterhead
 26 October – Women in Scotland are to be allowed to take abortion pills at home, bringing the country into line with others such as Sweden and France.
 2 November – First Minister Nicola Sturgeon and Cabinet Secretary for Finance and Constitution Derek Mackay sets out the Scottish Government's income tax options regarding a rise in the rate of Scottish income tax
 December (scheduled) – Abellio ScotRail introduces new (Class 385) electric trains as part of Edinburgh to Glasgow Improvement Programme
 Undated – Shieldhall Strategic Tunnel constructed to carry wastewater under Glasgow

The Arts 
 Jackie Kay publishes Bantam, her first poetry book as Makar (National Poet for Scotland)

Deaths 
1 January – George Miller (born 1929), cricketer
11 January – Canon Kenyon Wright (born 1932), Episcopal priest and political campaigner, chair of the Scottish Constitutional Convention
18 January – Johnny Little (born 1930 in Canada), footballer (Rangers, Morton, Scotland)
26 January – Tam Dalyell (born 1932), politician
3 February – Gordon Aikman, Scottish ALS campaigner (born 1985)
27 February – Alex Young (born 1937), footballer (Hearts, Everton, Scotland)
2 March – Tommy Gemmell (born 1943), footballer (Celtic, Dundee, Scotland) and manager
1 April – Stuart Markland (born 1948), footballer (Berwick Rangers, Dundee United, Montrose)
7 April – Mary Mumford, 15th Lady Herries of Terregles (born 1940), peeress
10 April – Sir Arnold Clark (born 1927), businessman
20 May – James Weatherhead (born 1931), Church of Scotland minister, Moderator of the General Assembly of the Church of Scotland (1993–1994)
25 June – Gordon Wilson (born 1938), leader of the Scottish National Party (1979–1990)
29 June – James Davidson (born 1927), politician, Liberal MP for West Aberdeenshire (1966–1970)
5 July – John McKenzie (born 1925), footballer (Partick Thistle, Dumbarton, Scotland)
19 July – Joe Walters (born 1935), footballer (Clyde)
20 July – John McCluskey, Baron McCluskey (born 1929), lawyer, judge and life peer, Solicitor General for Scotland (1974–1979)
2 August – Dave Caldwell (born 1932), footballer (Aberdeen)
4 August – Chuck Hay (born 1930), curler
15 August – Joe McGurn (born 1965), footballer (St Johnstone, Alloa Athletic, Stenhousemuir)
20 August – Gordon Williams (born 1934), screenwriter and novelist
31 August – Tormod MacGill-Eain (born 1936), Scottish Gaelic comedian, novelist, poet, musician and broadcaster
10 September – Stephen Begley (born 1975)  rugby union player (Glasgow Warriors)
1 October - John Swinburne (born 1930), former MSP 2003–2007.
26 October – Sir Gavin Laird (born 1933), trade unionist.
 29 December – Jim Baikie (born 1940), comics artist

See also 
 2017 in England
 2017 in Northern Ireland
  2017 in Wales

References 

 
2010s in Scotland
Years of the 21st century in Scotland
Scotland